Acrocercops cyma is a moth of the family Gracillariidae. It is known from Guadalcanal and Rennell Island.

References

cyma
Moths described in 1957
Moths of Oceania